Old Christiansburg Industrial Institute is a historic African American trade school complex located at Christiansburg, Montgomery County, Virginia.  The complex includes the Hill School (1885), the Schaeffer Memorial Baptist Church (1885), and the Primary Annex (1888).  The Hill School is a -story, cruciform-plan, gable-roof structure set on a low stone foundation. Although the building is stylistically in the Italianate mode, the windows suggest a Queen Anne Revival inspiration. The Schaeffer Memorial Baptist Church is a Victorian Gothic brick church building with a gable-roof and projecting southeast corner tower.  Connected to the church by a covered passageway is a wood-frame, tent-roof octagon, known as the Primary Annex.  A later building associated with the Christiansburg Industrial Institute is the separately listed Edgar A. Long Building built in 1927.

It was listed on the National Register of Historic Places in 2001.

References

African-American history of Virginia
School buildings on the National Register of Historic Places in Virginia
Carpenter Gothic architecture in Virginia
Italianate architecture in Virginia
Queen Anne architecture in Virginia
School buildings completed in 1885
Buildings and structures in Montgomery County, Virginia
National Register of Historic Places in Montgomery County, Virginia